The Cabinet of Dr. Caligari is a 1920 German silent film.

The Cabinet of Dr. Caligari  may also refer to:
 The Cabinet of Dr. Caligari (2005 film)

See also
 The Cabinet of Caligari, a 1962 horror film
 Caligari Corporation
 Dr. Caligari (film), a 1989 film